The Sultan Center (TSC) (Arabic: مركز سلطان) is a retail store chain from Kuwait.

History 
The four-decade-long story of The Sultan Center was founded by Jamil Sultan. In 1981, he established the first self-service retail store in Kuwait; it was based in Shuwaikh and took on a Home Center format. Jamil Sultan is regarded as a visionary and pioneer in the business community of Kuwait. In addition to founding The Sultan Center, he propelled Agility Logistics, a state-owned warehouse company into a worldwide logistics firm, and he was the Vice-Chairman of National Real Estate Company Kuwait (NREC), a leading real estate investment and development firm present in the Middle East and Africa.

The business ventured into the food retail industry with the opening of the Salmiya store in 1986 that is still serving customers with care as The Sultan Center's flagship store.

Retail presence 
The Sultan Center currently operates 70 stores in 4 countries. It owns over 40 stores in Kuwait with a running online shopping service. In Sultanate of Oman, where it first expanded outside Kuwait, it operates 7 retails stores. In addition to that, it owns 17 stores in Jordan and 3 in Bahrain. In February 2020 The Sultan Center celebrated the launch of its new flagship store in Kuwait during an opening ceremony held at the store’s new location in Al Kout Mall.

References

External links 
 Official website

Retail companies of Kuwait
Retail companies established in 1976
1976 establishments in Kuwait
Companies based in Kuwait City